Endocannabinoid reuptake inhibitors (eCBRIs), also called cannabinoid reuptake inhibitors (CBRIs), are drugs which limit the reabsorption of endocannabinoid neurotransmitters by the releasing neuron.

Pharmacology
The method of transport of endocannabinoids through the cell membrane and cytoplasm to their respective degradation enzymes has been rigorously debated for nearly two decades, and a putative endocannabinoid membrane transporter was proposed. However, as lipophilic molecules endocannabinoids readily pass through the cell lipid bilayer without assistance and would more likely need a chaperone through the cytoplasm to the endoplasmic reticulum where the enzyme FAAH is located.  More recently fatty acid-binding proteins (FABPs) and heat shock proteins (Hsp70s) have been described and verified as such chaperones, and their inhibitors have been synthesized. The inhibition of endocannabinoid reuptake raises the amount of those neurotransmitters available in the synaptic cleft and therefore increases neurotransmission. Following the increase of neurotransmission in the endocannabinoid system is the stimulation of its functions which, in humans, include: suppression of pain perception (analgesia), increased appetite, mood elevation and inhibition of short-term memory.

Examples of eCBRIs
 AM404 - an active metabolite of Paracetamol.
 AM1172
 LY-2183240 
 O-2093
 OMDM-2
 UCM-707
 VDM-11
 Guineensine
WOBE437 and RX-055

See also
 Endocannabinoid enhancer
 Endocannabinoid system
 Reuptake inhibitor
 Cannabinoid receptor antagonist
 Endocannabinoid transporters
 FAAH inhibitor
 MAGL inhibitor

References

Neurochemistry
Cannabinoids
Endocannabinoid reuptake inhibitors